Tamar is a female name of Hebrew origin, meaning "date" (the fruit), "date palm" or just "palm tree". There are three characters in the Bible with this name. Variants include Tamary and "Tamara".

The name was not often used in traditional Jewish societies, possibly because both Biblical characters bearing the name are depicted as victims of sexual violence.  It was, however, among the Biblical names revived and actively promoted by the Zionist pioneers, and is a common female name in contemporary Israel (often shortened, as in other languages, to "Tammy" (תמי) – which is sometimes treated as name on its own).

Tamar is common among Georgians, where its origin can be traced either to the above-mentioned Biblical Hebrew characters, to the sky goddess Tamar, who had an important role in the Georgians' mythology before their conversion to Christianity or to a convergence of both.

In turn, the popularity of the name (especially in the version "Tamara") among Russians and other Slavic peoples can in part be traced to the centuries-long political and cultural contacts between Russians and Georgians.  In particular, Russia was touched by the fame of the medieval queen regnant Tamar of Georgia, reckoned among the greatest of her country's monarchs and who had a Russian husband.

Tamar was also among the Biblical names used by Puritans in the American Colonial Era in the 17th and 18th centuries. Puritan families sometimes used names of Biblical characters seen as sinful as a reminder of man's fallen state.

People with the given name Tamar 

 Tamar (Genesis), daughter-in-law of Judah in the Bible
 Tamar (daughter of David), daughter of King David and full sister of his son Absalom in the Bible
 Tamar, daughter of David's son Absalom
 Tamar of Georgia (1160–1213), Georgian queen
 Tamar of Imereti (died 1556), Georgian princess
 Tamar of Kartli (1696–1746), Georgian queen
 Tamar of Mukhrani (died 1683), Georgian princess
 Támar (born 1980), American singer
 Tamar Abakelia (1905–1953), Georgian artist
 Tamar Ariav (born 1949), Israeli professor of education and President of Beit Berl College
 Tamar Amilakhori (fl. 17th-century), Safavid concubine of Georgian origin
 Tamar Beruchashvili (born 1961), Georgian politician
 Tamar Braxton (born 1977), American singer
 Tamar Eilam, Israeli-American computer scientist
 Tamar Garb (born 1957), British art historian
 Tamar Gendler (born 1965), American philosopher
 Tamar Gozansky (born 1940), Israeli politician
 Tamar Halperin (born 1976), Israeli musician
 Tamar Hermann (born 1957), Israeli political scientist
 Tamar Jacoby (born 1954), American writer
 Tamar Kaprelian (born 1986), American singer
 Tamar Katz (born 1988), Israeli figure skater
 Tamar Sanikidze (born 1978), Georgian politician
 Tamar Simon Hoffs (born 1934), American film director
 Tamar Slay (born 1980), American basketball player
 Tamar Tatuashvili (born 1991), Georgian football player
 Tamar Tavadze (1898–1975), Georgian artist
 Tamar Tumanyan (1907–1989), Soviet Armenian architect
 Tamar Zandberg (born 1976), Israeli politician

Fictional characters
Hilary Tamar, fictional character in the novels of Sarah Caudwell
Tamar Cauldwell, the central character in the epic poem Tamar by Robinson Jeffers
Tamar Kir-Bataar, a character from the Grishaverse book series by Leigh Bardugo.

Equivalents in other languages
 tamr - which is the plural form and singular form "Tamra" (Arabic: تَمْرَة tamrah)

See also
Tamar (disambiguation) 
Tamara (name)
Tammy (given name)

References

Hebrew-language names
Georgian feminine given names